The 1948–49 season was the 49th season in the history of Berner Sport Club Young Boys. The team played their home games at Stadion Wankdorf in Bern.

Players
 Eich
 Flühmann
 Zehnder
 C. Casali
 Giacometti
 Hochstrasser
 Neuenschwander
 Beerli
 Grütter
 Monti
 Weil

Competitions

Overall record

Nationalliga B

League table

Matches

Swiss Cup

References

BSC Young Boys seasons
Swiss football clubs 1948–49 season